The Dominica women's national football team is the national women's football team of Dominica and is overseen by the Dominica Football Association.

Results and fixtures

The following is a list of match results in the last 12 months, as well as any future matches that have been scheduled.

Legend

2022

Coaching staff

Players

Current squad
The following players were called up for the match against Nicaragua on 12 April 2022.

Competitive record

FIFA World Cup

*Draws include knockout matches decided on penalty kicks.

CONCACAF W Championship record

*Draws include knockout matches decided on penalty kicks.

See also 

 Dominica national football team (Men)

References

External links
Official website
FIFA Profile

Caribbean women's national association football teams
women